The Shellharbour City Dragons are an Australian  rugby league football club based in the Shellharbour, New South Wales. They currently are not competing in any competitions and formerly competed in the New South Wales Cup in 2009 and 2010 and acted as a feeder club to the NRL club St. George Illawarra Dragons.

History
The Shellharbour City Dragons were formed from current Illwarra Carlton League and former Group 7 Rugby League member, the Shellharbour Sharks. The Sharks administration still run this version of Shellharbour City representation as well as the other Sharks sides. The Dragons were established in 2007 as the Shellharbour City Marlins to act as a feeder club to the St George Illawarra Dragons, initially entering the NSWRL Jim Beam Cup with the thought in mind to gain entry into the NSW Cup, a feat achieved in 2009. When this occurred, the name was converted from Marlins to Dragons to further enhance the association between the two clubs. In 2011, the Dragons failed to come up with money to field a team in the NSW Cup, so currently the club is taking a hiatus from this competition with an aim to return in 2012.

2010 squad
 Jack Bosden
 Jace Brown
 Ian Catania
 Brad Davidson
 Daniel Deaves
 Nick Emmett
 Donas Gock
 Bronx Goodwin
 Michael Greenfield
 Aaron Henry
 Beau Henry
 Luke Howell
 Daniel Jimenez
 Scott Jones
 Scotty Jones
 Matthew Kent
 Michael Lett
 Lulia Lulia
 Jake Maketo
 Trent Merrin
 Ryan Millard
 Damian Paulissen
 Junior Paulo
 Luke Priddis
 Ricky Thorby
 Mataika Vatuvei
 Joe Vickery

References

External links
  Shellharbour City Dragons
 New South Wales rugby league

2007 establishments in Australia
Rugby clubs established in 2007
Rugby league teams in Wollongong
St. George Illawarra Dragons
Ron Massey Cup
City of Shellharbour